The Heritage 20 is an American trailerable sailboat that was designed by Andras Davidhazy as a cruiser and first built in 1967.

Production
The design was built by Howie Craft Plastics in the city of Lake Oswego, Oregon, United States, between 1967 and 1971, but it is now out of production. The company was mostly a one-man operation, run by the founder, Howard Renner. The boats were built one at a time, with only 12 examples completed.

Design
The Heritage 20 is a recreational keelboat, built predominantly of fiberglass, with extensive wood trim. It has a masthead sloop rig; a spooned, raked stem; a raised counter, angled transom; a keel-mounted rudder controlled by a tiller and a fixed long keel. It displaces  and carries  of lead ballast.

The boat is fitted with a Westerbeke diesel engine or a small  outboard motor for docking and maneuvering.

The design has sleeping accommodation for four people, with a double "V"-berth in the bow cabin and two straight settee berths in the main cabin. The galley is located on both sides, just aft of the bow cabin. The galley is equipped with a sink. The head is located in the bilge, down in the extra-wide long keel.

For sailing downwind the design may be equipped with a symmetrical spinnaker.

Operational history
In a 2010 review Steve Henkel wrote, "the most unusual feature of the Heritage 20 is her extra-wide keel, big enough to contain a marine toilet (though we wonder how the waste is pumped uphill to a seacock without backflow, in the good old days before the advent of holding tanks). Best features: Perhaps it is no accident that the Heritage's shape bears a strong resemblance to the beauteous profiles of John Alden's designs, since her designer worked in the Alden office. Her curved stem and stern counter could be right out of an Alden style book. Pretty! Despite her shallow draft and tall rig, Heritage will probably sail better than her comp[etitor]s, none of which is deeper; her high SA/D will make her relatively faster in light air. Worst features: Even with the trick cabin sole, there's not much room below. Big and tall people beware!"

See also
List of sailing boat types

References

External links
Photo of a Heritage 20 with the designer at the helm

Keelboats
1960s sailboat type designs
Sailing yachts
Trailer sailers
Sailboat types built by Howie Craft Plastics
Sailboat type designs by Andras Davidhazy